In Norse mythology, Borr or Burr (Old Norse: 'son', born; sometimes anglicized Bor, Bör or Bur) was the son of Búri. Borr was the husband of Bestla and the father of Odin, Vili and Vé. Borr receives mention in a poem in the Poetic Edda, compiled in the 13th century from earlier traditional material, and in the Prose Edda, composed in the 13th century by Icelander Snorri Sturluson. Scholars have proposed a variety of theories about the figure.

Attestation 
Borr is mentioned in the fourth verse of the Völuspá, a poem contained in the Poetic Edda, and in the sixth chapter of Gylfaginning, the second section of the Prose Edda.

Völuspá

Gylfaginning 

Borr is not mentioned again in the Prose Edda. In skaldic and eddaic poetry, Odin is occasionally referred to as Borr's son.

Scholarly reception and interpretation 
The role of Borr in Norse mythology is unclear. Nineteenth-century German scholar Jacob Grimm proposed to equate Borr with Mannus as related in Tacitus' Germania on the basis of the similarity in their functions in Germanic theogeny.

The 19th century Icelandic scholar and archaeologist Finnur Magnússon hypothesized that Borr was "intended to signify [...] the first mountain or mountain-chain, which it was deemed by the forefathers of our race had emerged from the waters in the same region where the first land made its appearance. This mountain chain is probably the Caucasus, called by the Persians Borz (the genitive of the Old Norse Borr). Bör's wife, Belsta or Bestla, a daughter of the giant Bölthorn (spina calamitosa), is possibly the mass of ice formed on the alpine summits." In his Lexicon Mythologicum, published four years later, he modified his theory to claim that Borr symbolized the earth, and Bestla the ocean, which gave birth to Odin as the "world spirit" or "great soul of the earth" (spiritus mundi nostri; terrae magna anima, aëris et aurae numen), Vili or Hoenir as the "heavenly light" (lux, imprimis coelestis) and Vé or Lódur as "fire" (ignis, vel elementalis vel proprie sic dictus).

Highlighting that no source provides information about Borr's mother (Borr's father was licked free from the earth by the primeval cow Auðumbla), Rudolf Simek observes that "It is not clear how Burr came to be".

Notes and citations

References

 Brodeur, Arthur Gilchrist (transl.) (1916). The Prose Edda by Snorri Sturluson. New York: The American-Scandinavian Foundation.
 Bellows, Henry Adams (1927). The Poetic Edda. New York: The American-Scandinavian Foundation.
 Finnur Magnússon (1824). Eddalaeren og dens oprindelse, Vol. I.
 Grimm, Jacob (1883). Teutonic Mythology, Vol. I. London: G. Bell and Sons.
 Lindow, John (2001). Handbook of Norse Mythology. Santa Barbara: ABC-CLIO.
 Lorenz, Gottfried (1984). Gylfaginning. Darmstadt: Wissenschaftliche Buchgesellschaft.
 Mallet, M. (1847). Northern Antiquities. London: Henry G. Bohn.
 Nordal, Sigurd (1980). Völuspá. Darmstadt: Wissenschaftliche Buchgesellschaft.
 Simek, Rudolf (1988). Lexikon der germanischen Mythologie. Stuttgart: Alfred Kröner.
 Simek, Rudolf (2007) translated by Angela Hall. Dictionary of Northern Mythology. D.S. Brewer. 
 Thorpe, Benjamin (1851). Northern Mythology. London: Edward Lumley.

Æsir
Norse gods